Nikolay Andreyevich Kamenskiy (17 October 1931 – 21 July 2017) was a Soviet former ski jumper who competed in the late 1950s and early 1960s. He won a silver medal in the individual large hill at the 1962 FIS Nordic World Ski Championships in Zakopane.

Kamenskiy also finished fourth in the individual large hill competition at the 1960 Winter Olympics in Squaw Valley. He also won the ski jump competition at the Holmenollen ski festival in 1958, the Four Hills Tournament in 1956, and two other victories in normal hill events in 1957.

References

Holmenkollen Winners since 1892

1931 births
2017 deaths
Holmenkollen Ski Festival winners
Olympic ski jumpers of the Soviet Union
Soviet male ski jumpers
Ski jumpers at the 1960 Winter Olympics
Ski jumpers at the 1964 Winter Olympics
Sportspeople from Moscow
FIS Nordic World Ski Championships medalists in ski jumping